Bezirk Ried im Innkreis is a district of the state of 
Upper Austria in Austria.

Municipalities 
Towns (Städte) are indicated in boldface; market towns (Marktgemeinden) in italics; suburbs, hamlets and other subdivisions of a municipality are indicated in small characters.
Andrichsfurt
Antiesenhofen
Aurolzmünster
Eberschwang
Eitzing
Geiersberg
Geinberg
Gurten
Hohenzell
Kirchdorf am Inn
Kirchheim im Innkreis
Lambrechten
Lohnsburg
Mehrnbach
Mettmach
Mörschwang
Mühlheim am Inn
Neuhofen im Innkreis
Obernberg am Inn
Ort im Innkreis
Pattigham
Peterskirchen
Pramet
Reichersberg
Ried im Innkreis
Sankt Georgen bei Obernberg am Inn
Sankt Marienkirchen am Hausruck
Sankt Martin im Innkreis
Schildorn
Senftenbach
Taiskirchen im Innkreis
Tumeltsham
Utzenaich
Waldzell
Weilbach
Wippenham

External links 
 Official site

 
Districts of Upper Austria